Sir Geoffrey Rhodes Bromet  (28 August 1891 – 16 November 1983) was a senior Royal Air Force (RAF) officer during the Second World War and Lieutenant Governor of the Isle of Man from 1945 to 1952. Bromet Road in the town of Castletown, Isle of Man, takes its name from him.

RAF career
Bromet attended the Royal Naval College, Dartmouth and then served as a Flight Commander in the First World War, being commended for his service at Gallipoli in 1915 and later commanding No. 1 Squadron RNAS and then No. 8 Squadron RNAS. In 1919 he was commissioned permanently as a major in the Royal Air Force. After commanding the Marine Aircraft Experimental Establishment, he was appointed Senior Engineering Staff Officer at Headquarters Coastal Area in 1931, Senior Air Staff Officer at Headquarters RAF Middle East in 1933 and Senior Air Staff Officer at Headquarters RAF Coastal Command in 1936.

He served in the Second World War as Air Officer Commanding No. 19 Group and then as Air Officer Commanding No. 247 Group before retiring at his own request in 1945.

In 1945 he was appointed Lieutenant Governor of the Isle of Man and served until 1952.

His second marriage was to Air Commandant Dame Jean Conan Doyle, daughter of Sir Arthur Conan Doyle.

References

|-

|-

Royal Air Force air marshals
1891 births
1983 deaths
Knights Commander of the Order of the British Empire
Companions of the Order of the Bath
Companions of the Distinguished Service Order
Chevaliers of the Légion d'honneur
Commanders with Star of the Order of Polonia Restituta
Grand Officers of the Order of the White Lion
Commanders of the Legion of Merit
Deputy Lieutenants of Kent
Lieutenant Governors of the Isle of Man
Royal Naval Air Service aviators
Royal Navy officers of World War I
Graduates of Britannia Royal Naval College